Operation Termite took place during the Malayan Emergency. It involved extensive attacks on communist camps, dropping over 200 British troops into the jungle. Communist casualties were low but many camps were destroyed.

The RAAF flew in support of the operation.

References

External links
Documentary about the operation

Wars involving the United Kingdom
Malayan Emergency
July 1954 events in Asia
1954 in Malaya